Shahrak-e Isar (also Romanized as Shahrak-e Īs̄ār) is a village in Kuhestan Rural District, Rostaq District, Darab County, Fars Province, Iran. At the 2006 census, its population was 866, in 200 families.

References 

Populated places in Darab County